Results is the ninth studio album by Liza Minnelli, released in 1989. It was produced by Pet Shop Boys and Julian Mendelsohn. The album was a success in the United Kingdom, where it reached number 6 on the UK Albums Chart and was certified Gold by BPI (promoted by the lead single, "Losing My Mind", which reached number 6 on the UK Singles Chart). The album was re-released by Cherry Red Records, in an expanded edition with 4 discs (3 CDs and 1 DVD), on September 25, 2017.

Production and release
In 1988 Minnelli had expressed an interest in doing a pop album, completely in contrast with her normal output when she joined Epic Records. Tom Watkins, the manager of the Pet Shop Boys was in the US offices at Epic around this time, promoting his new band Bros. He heard that Minnelli had just been signed by Epic and suggested that Neil Tennant and Chris Lowe of The Pet Shop Boys could work with her on the album. As it happened, Minnelli had heard their song "Rent" and loved it and was thrilled to hear that they might be interested to work with her. Tennant was already a fan of Minnelli and set about writing some songs specifically for her. In March 1989, Minnelli was on tour in London and recorded the vocals for the album during the day. She was surprised on arriving at the studios to learn that the musical backing had already been recorded, a process she was unfamiliar with. She found working with the duo to be great fun but also challenging, saying that Tennant did not compromise and would push her vocally to ranges lower than she was used to. She was keen to record a cover of "Rent" and also expressed particular satisfaction with the song "So Sorry, I Said", saying that the lyrics were very true to her. In general, she was impressed with the duo's work lyrically, and was very pleased with the finished album.<ref name=Wogan>Wogan Interview with Liza Minnelli, Neil Tennant and Chris Lowe, transmitted: 31 July 1989</ref>

Of the songs contained, "Losing My Mind" is from the 1971 musical Follies. "Twist in My Sobriety" was originally recorded by Tanita Tikaram, from the 1988 album Ancient Heart. "Love Pains" was originally recorded by Yvonne Elliman, from the 1979 album Yvonne. "Rent" and "Tonight Is Forever" were both originally recorded by Pet Shop Boys from, respectively, the albums Actually (1987) and Please (1986). The Pet Shop Boys demo version of "Losing My Mind" (which had Neil Tennant singing the vocal) was later 'tidied up' and released as a B-side on the Pet Shop Boys single "Jealousy". The bridge to "If There Was Love" features Minnelli reciting Sonnet 94 by William Shakespeare: "They that have power to hurt".

The album title was chosen, at Minnelli's request, by Pet Shop Boys after they heard an offhand comment by their friend Janet Street-Porter regarding some of her clothes ("I call it my results wear 'cause when I wear them I always get results").

Commercial performance
The first single released was a decidedly electronic working of the Stephen Sondheim song "Losing My Mind" in August 1989. Minnelli promoted the song on various television shows in Europe and the US. It became a big hit in the UK, peaking at No.6, where she appeared on Top of the Pops that month. The album was released a month later where it also reached No.6 in the UK. Results'' also reached number 13 in Spain and was certified Gold there. The album was less successful in the United States, peaking only at number 128 on the Billboard 200. Three more singles were released from the album during 1989 and 1990, namely "Don't Drop Bombs", "So Sorry, I Said" and "Love Pains" all of them charted in UK. The album sold 600,000 copies in Europe only.

Track listing

Personnel 
Angelo Badalamenti – orchestra arrangement
J.J. Belle – guitar
Danny Cummings – percussion
Anne Dudley – orchestra arrangement, orchestra conductor
Donald Johnson – rap
Carol Kenyon – backing vocals
Katie Kissoon – backing vocals
Chris Lowe – keyboards, programming
Gary Maughan – programming
C.J. Mackintosh – programming, scratching
Julian Mendelsohn – keyboards, programming, backing vocals
Tessa Niles – backing vocals
Courtney Pine – saxophone
Andy Richards – keyboards, programming
Neil Tennant – keyboards, backing vocals, vocoder
Peter-John Vettese – keyboards, piano

Charts and certifications

Weekly charts

Certifications and sales

References 

1989 albums
Liza Minnelli albums
Pet Shop Boys albums
Epic Records albums
Albums produced by Julian Mendelsohn